Walter Wilson was a footballer who played for Mansfield Town, Burslem Port Vale, and Nelson.

Career
Wilson played for Mansfield Town before joining Burslem Port Vale in July 1894. After playing only five Second Division games in the 1894–95 season, he left the Athletic Ground and was transferred to Nelson in December 1894.

Career statistics
Source:

References

Year of birth missing
Year of death missing
Association football midfielders
English footballers
Mansfield Town F.C. players
Port Vale F.C. players
Nelson F.C. players
English Football League players
English football managers
Latvia national football team managers